Fiona Lesley Smith (born October 31, 1973 in Saskatoon, Saskatchewan and raised in Edam, Saskatchewan) is a Canadian women's Olympic ice hockey player. She was affiliated with Edmonton Chimos. In 1998 she helped Team Canada win the silver medal at the Olympic Winter Games in Nagano.

Career 

Smith was originally a figure skater, as there were no opportunities for girls to play hockey. She captained the boys youth hockey team in North Battleford before joining the first Saskatchewan women's hockey team to compete at the Canada Winter Games at the age of 14. 

In 1999, she was nominated for the Saskatchewan Female Athlete of the Year award. In 2002, she would retire from international hockey. She was one of the torch bearers for the 2010 Winter Olympics in Vancouver. In 2012, she was named to the Saskatchewan Sports Hall of Fame.

Post-playing Career  

As part of the IIHF Ambassador and Mentor Program, Brisson was a Hockey Canada athlete ambassador that travelled to Bratislava, Slovakia to participate in the 2011 IIHF High Performance Women's Camp from July 4–12. She would then work with the German national women's hockey team for two and a half years as an IIHF ambassador.

References

External links
 
 
 
 
 

1973 births
Living people
Canadian women's ice hockey defencemen
Edmonton Chimos players
Sportspeople from Saskatoon
Ice hockey players at the 1998 Winter Olympics
Medalists at the 1998 Winter Olympics
Olympic ice hockey players of Canada
Olympic medalists in ice hockey
Olympic silver medalists for Canada
Ice hockey people from Saskatchewan